Thaddeus Joseph Cardines Atalig (born 7 May 1995) is a Guamanian international footballer.

Atalig attended the St. John's School (Guam) and played for the Knights soccer team. He started in 2012 in the Budweiser Guam Men's Soccer League Division One for Fuji-Ichiban Espada.

International 

He made his first appearance for the Guam national football team in 2012.

References

Guamanian footballers
Guam international footballers
1995 births
Living people
Bowling Green Falcons men's soccer players
Association football midfielders